Atsipopoulo is a local community of the Rethymno Municipality in the  Rethymno (regional unit) of the region of Crete established by Kallikratis reform. Previously, it was part of municipality of Nikiforos Fokas. Capital of the new municipality is Rethymno.

Population of   Atsipopoulo

See also
List of settlements in the Rethymno regional unit

External links 
Photo Gallery, Web site of municipality of Rethymnno retrieved at 11 April 2012
Cycling routes, Web site of Tourism Promotion Committee of Rethymno Prefecture, retrieved at 11 April 2012

References

Populated places in Rethymno (regional unit)